Jack of All Trades is a half-hour-long syndicated action comedy TV series which ran for two seasons in 2000. With Cleopatra 2525, it formed the Back2Back Action Hour and both shows were notable for being the first American non-animated action series to be produced in the half-hour format since the 1970s. The show was canceled in the middle of its second season.

Plot
It is set at the turn of the 19th century (beginning in 1801) on the fictional French-controlled island of Pulau-Pulau in the East Indies. Jack Stiles is an American secret agent sent there by President Jefferson. While there, he meets his British contact and love interest, English spy Emilia Rothschild. Together, the two work to stop Napoleon and various other threats to the United States. To the public, Jack is seen as Emilia's attaché (she sometimes serves as his), and in order to protect his identity as a secret agent, while acting against the enemies of America, Jack often adopts the identity of a legendary (though otherwise fictional) masked hero: "the Daring Dragoon".

The show contained many ongoing gags, such as historical inaccuracies (such as Canada being a French territory rather than part of the British Empire, and Benjamin Franklin being on the 100 dollar bill during his lifetime), Jack being responsible for many important historical events but not receiving credit, Emilia inventing a miraculous invention in an obvious deus ex machina, sexual puns and innuendos, and Jack and Emilia's ongoing romantic tension.

Cast
Bruce Campbell as Jack Stiles
Angela Dotchin as Emilia Rothschild
Stuart Devenie as Governor Croque
Stephen Papps as Captain Brogard
Shemp Wooley as the voice of Jean-Claude
Verne Troyer as Napoleon Bonaparte (recurring guest – 4 episodes)

Production

Theme song
The tune and lyrics are based on numerous period songs, such as the "Marines' Hymn" and "Yankee Doodle". The theme song was nominated for the "Outstanding Main Theme Title Song" Emmy in 2000, but lost to The West Wing.

Historical figures
Many episodes of Jack of All Trades involved parodies of historical figures. Furthering the show's inaccuracies, some of these figures died before the show's 1801 time period.

The following is a list of historical figures who appeared on the show:

 Thomas Jefferson (Charles Pierard) 2 episodes
 Blackbeard (Hori Ahipene) 2 episodes
 Benjamin Franklin (John Sumner)
 James Madison (Patrick Smith)
 Napoleon and Josephine Bonaparte (Verne Troyer 4 episodes and Celia Nicholson 1 episode)
 Marquis de Sade (Stuart Devenie)
 Meriwether Lewis and William Clark (Patrick Wilson and Peter Rowley)
 Sacagawea (Vanessa Rare)
 King George III (Mark Hadlow)
 Catherine the Great (Danielle Cormack)
 Leonardo da Vinci is parodied by his fictitious descendant Nardo da Vinci (Michael Hurst).

Episodes
Season 1

Season 2

References

Notes

External links
 
 DVD Talk's Review of The Complete Series

2000s American comedy television series
Steampunk television series
2000 American television series debuts
2000 American television series endings
Television shows filmed in New Zealand
Television series by Universal Television
Works about the Napoleonic Wars
Television series set in the 1800s
First-run syndicated television programs in the United States
Action Pack (TV programming block)
Works by Alex Kurtzman and Roberto Orci
Jack tales
New Zealand fantasy television series
Fantasy comedy television series
American action comedy television series